Qidan Guo Zhi ("Records of the Khitan State") is a 13th-century Chinese book chronicling the history of the Liao dynasty (916–1125) and the Khitan people. It was written by Ye Longli of the Southern Song dynasty, probably published 1265–1274 during Emperor Duzong's reign, even though the preface claimed it was submitted to the throne in 1180. Ye Longli did not pass the imperial examination until 1247.

Contents
Consisting of 27 chapters (卷), the book includes history about the Khitan people before the foundation of the Liao dynasty, although this section is laden with superstition. The book primarily relies on sources from the Northern Song dynasty and thus differs from the History of Liao which is mainly based on official records from the Liao dynasty itself.

References

Chinese history texts
13th-century history books
Song dynasty literature
History books about the Liao dynasty
13th-century Chinese books